Miramar is a corregimiento in Santa Isabel District, Colón Province, Panama with a population of 201 as of 2010. Its population as of 1990 was 88; its population as of 2000 was 180.

References

Corregimientos of Colón Province